Vishnu Gopal Prabhu (born 12 August 1955) is an Indian politician and businessperson from Goa. He is a former Member of the Goa Legislative Assembly representing the Sanvordem Assembly constituency from 1994 to 1999. He was a member of the Maharashtrawadi Gomantak Party.

Early and personal life
Vishnu Gopal Prabhu was born at Shigao-Collem, Goa to Prabhu Gopal Vishnu. He completed his Secondary School Certificate from Our Lady of Piety High School, Collem, Goa in 1975. He is an alumnus of the Industrial Training Institute (1991). Prabhu also has a diploma in electrical supervisor. 

He is married to Vishupriya Prabhu and currently resides at Turimaradwada, Shigao-Collem, Goa. Some of his hobbies include reading and social work. He has a special interest in agriculture.

Career
Prior contesting the Goa Legislative Assembly elections, Prabhu was elected as a panch of the Collem village panchayat from 1986 to 1995. He contested the 1994 Goa Legislative Assembly election from the Sanvordem Assembly constituency on the Maharashtrawadi Gomantak Party ticket, he emerged victorious by defeating Indian National Congress candidate, Marathe Sadashiv Vaman.

References

1955 births
Living people
Goan people
People from South Goa district
Goa MLAs 1994–1999
20th-century Indian politicians
21st-century Indian politicians
Indian politicians
Maharashtrawadi Gomantak Party politicians
Shiv Sena politicians